Michael Essa is an American Drifter and racing driver who competes in the Formula D series, winning the championship in 2023 in a BMW M3.

He started his career in autocross racing at the age of 16 and has driven a variety of different cars in his drift career, including a Mazda RX-7, BMW E92, BMW Z4 and a BMW M3 E46. In the 2015 season, Essa switched to a Chevrolet Camaro.

Essa switched back to a BMW E46 M3 in recent years.

References

Drifting drivers
American racing drivers
Living people
Formula D drivers
Year of birth missing (living people)